Pheidole bula is a species of ant in the genus Pheidole. It was discovered in Fiji, and described by  E. M. Sarnat in 2008.

References

External links
Pheidole bula at PLAZI

bula
Insects described in 2008